Uroactinia is a genus of mites in the order Mesostigmata, placed in its own family, Uroactinidae.

Species

Uroactinia agitans (Banks, 1908)
Uroactinia anchor (Trouessart, 1902)
Uroactinia aquatica (Piersig, 1906)
Uroactinia assamensis Hirschmann, 1990
Uroactinia australiensis Hirschmann, 1990
Uroactinia bermudaensis (Ewing, 1920)
Uroactinia bicarinata (Trägårdh, 1931)
Uroactinia brasiliensis (Berlese, 1903)
Uroactinia brasiloides Hirschmann, 1990
Uroactinia brevipila (Driel, Loots & Marais, 1977)
Uroactinia brevipilaoides Hirschmann, 1990
Uroactinia cavernicola (Hutzu, 1997)
Uroactinia centroamericana (Stoll, 1893)
Uroactinia cocosensis Hirschmann, 1990
Uroactinia consanguinea (Berlese, 1905)
Uroactinia coprophila Sellnick, 1958
Uroactinia cubaensis Hirschmann, 1990
Uroactinia daelei Hirschmann, 1981
Uroactinia domrowi Hirschmann, 1990
Uroactinia dracaena Hirschmann, 1990
Uroactinia endroedyi Hirschmann, 1990
Uroactinia franzi Hirschmann, 1990
Uroactinia fusina Ma, 2003
Uroactinia galapagosensis Hirschmann, 1990
Uroactinia guineae Hirschmann, 1990
Uroactinia hawaiiensis Hirschmann, 1990
Uroactinia hippocrepea (Berlese, 1918)
Uroactinia hippocrepoidea (Vitzthum, 1935)
Uroactinia hiramatsui Hirschmann, 1990
Uroactinia hirschmanni Hiramatsu, 1978
Uroactinia kapangae Hirschmann, 1990
Uroactinia kargi (Hirschmann, 1990)
Uroactinia krantzi (Hirschmann, 1990)
Uroactinia lukoschusi (Hirschmann, 1990)
Uroactinia luluae Hirschmann, 1990
Uroactinia luzonensis Hirschmann, 1990
Uroactinia mira (Vitzthum, 1921)
Uroactinia neotropica Hirschmann, 1990
Uroactinia nidiphila Wisniewski & Hirschmann, 1983
Uroactinia oblita Hirschmann, 1990
Uroactinia okuensis Hirschmann, 1990
Uroactinia ovata (Fox, 1948)
Uroactinia peruensis Hirschmann, 1990
Uroactinia philippinensis (Vitzthum, 1921)
Uroactinia popocensis Hirschmann, 1990
Uroactinia porosa Hirschmann, 1990
Uroactinia rarosae Hiramatsu & Hirschmann in Hirschmann 1990
Uroactinia sellnicki Hirschmann, 1990
Uroactinia sellnickiagitans Hirschmann, 1990
Uroactinia sellnickihippocrepea Hirschmann, 1990
Uroactinia surinamensis Hirschmann, 1990
Uroactinia traegardhi Sellnick, 1964
Uroactinia vitzthumiconsanguinea Hirschmann, 1990
Uroactinia vitzthumihippocrepea Hirschmann, 1990
Uroactinia vitzthumimira Hirschmann, 1990
Uroactinia wisniewskii Hirschmann, 1990
Uroactinia woelkei (Hirschmann, 1990)

References

Mesostigmata